Viktor Yansky (born 30 July 1969) is a Uzbekistani weightlifter. He competed in the men's flyweight event at the 1996 Summer Olympics.

References

1969 births
Living people
Uzbekistani male weightlifters
Olympic weightlifters of Uzbekistan
Weightlifters at the 1996 Summer Olympics
People from Samarkand
Weightlifters at the 1998 Asian Games
Asian Games competitors for Uzbekistan
20th-century Uzbekistani people
21st-century Uzbekistani people